Nikodem Sujecki (born 27 February 2003) is a Polish professional footballer who plays as a goalkeeper for Resovia.

Career statistics

Club

Notes

References

2003 births
Living people
Polish footballers
Poland youth international footballers
Association football goalkeepers
III liga players
II liga players
I liga players
UKS SMS Łódź players
Pogoń Szczecin players
Olimpia Grudziądz players
Skra Częstochowa players
Resovia (football) players